Armando Përlleshi (born 29 January 2003) is an Albanian professional footballer who plays as a goalkeeper.

References

2003 births
Living people
Albanian footballers
Albanian expatriate footballers
Albanian expatriate sportspeople in Greece
Expatriate footballers in Greece
Super League Greece 2 players
Super League Greece players
Trikala F.C. players
Ionikos F.C. players
Association football goalkeepers